Knabs Ridge Wind Farm is an electricity generating site just south of the A59 road near to Felliscliffe, Kettlesing, North Yorkshire, England. It was the first wind farm to be built in North Yorkshire in over 15 years, and was believed to be the first time that civilian air traffic was considered in the planning permission process.

History
The proposal to build a wind farm on the site was first unveiled in 2003 when 6,000 homes in the area were leafleted with information about the wind farm. At that early stage, many objections were registered, including one from the Campaign for the Protection of Rural England (CPRE).
Planning consent for the wind farm was rejected by Harrogate Borough Council in November 2004. Npower appealed against the decision and the application then went before a public enquiry, which gained government consent in September 2005. The objection by LBA towards the wind farm is believed to be the first time that civilian air traffic paths have featured in an onshore wind farm consent inquiry. The planning inspector also rejected the idea of affixing red lights to each tower as it was thought that they could interfere with drivers concentration on the adjacent A59 road.

Each generating unit was constructed by Senvion and is capable of generating 2 MW of power with the whole farm itself generating 16 MW in total.

One of the turbines caught fire in January 2017 and had to be extinguished by North Yorkshire fire service. Each unit operates in tandem with three others (the Knabs Ridge site has eight units, which operate in two groups of four) which resulted in all four generating units being turned off. Seven months after the fire, the owners were seeking to overturn a condition in the planning permission of the site that was set in 2005. If a turbine was to not generate power in over twelve months, then the owners are required to remove the tower and return the land to grazing purposes for cattle. By October 2017, the tower was still not active.

See also
List of onshore wind farms in the United Kingdom

References

External links

Key facts PDF sheet

Buildings and structures in North Yorkshire
Wind farms in England
Harrogate
Power stations in Yorkshire and the Humber